The Ecological Society of Australia (ESA) is the peak group of ecologists in Australia, with over 1100 members from all Australian states and territories. The ESA has an impressive 60 year history supporting ecologists, promoting ecology and ecological research.

ESA publishes two journals: Austral Ecology  and Ecological Management and Restoration. The society hosts the largest annual ecological conference in Australia.

Censorship issue 

An article published by Nature in September 2020 detailed results of a survey of ecology-related scientists that indicated many were experiencing increased pressure to suppress information about their scientific research, in Australia and around the world. ESA offered suggestions for solutions through institutional changes and established a permanent online portal for anonymous reporting of suppression of information derived through environmental research.

External links 

 Austral Ecology
 Ecological Management and Restoration

References 

Scientific societies based in Australia